"Candidatus Caballeronia nigropunctata" is a Candidatus species of bacteria from the genus Caballeronia and the family Burkholderiaceae. "Candidatus Caballeronia nigropunctata" is an endosymbiont of the plant Psychotria nigropunctata.

References

Burkholderiaceae
Bacteria described in 2004
Candidatus taxa